"Dangerous" is a song by American rapper Meek Mill featuring Jeremih and PnB Rock. It appears on Meek Mill's EP Legends of the Summer and his album Championships. The song samples "Come and Talk to Me" by American R&B group Jodeci.

Background
The song originally appeared on Meek Mill's fifth extended play, Legends of the Summer, which was released on July 6, 2018. On November 5, 2018, it was released as the second single from the EP. Later that month, it also served as the lead single from his fourth studio album Championships, released on November 25.

Remix
On June 13, 2019, American singer Trey Songz released a remix of the song.

Music video
The song's music video premiered on October 30, 2018, and has over 66 million views as of February 2020.

Charts

Weekly charts

Year-end charts

Certification

References

2018 singles
2018 songs
Jeremih songs
Meek Mill songs
PnB Rock songs
Songs written by Christopher Dotson
Songs written by DeVante Swing
Songs written by Jeremih
Songs written by Meek Mill
Songs written by Hitmaka
Songs written by PnB Rock